Souvenirs is the seventh studio album by Dutch rock band The Gathering. It was released on 24 February 2003 through independent label Psychonaut Records; the label was founded by the band in 1999.

Overview 
Souvenirs is the first full-length release from The Gathering since parting ways with Century Media, and the first full-length release for Psychonaut Records. The album was recorded at E-Sound, Weesp, Loud Amsterdam and A1 Amsterdam during 2002 and 2003 under the guidance of producer Zlaya Hadzich. The album was engineered by Zlaya Hadzich, Sietze Gardenier, David Klooker & Ignaz Bruens; mixed at A1, Loud & E-Sound by Zlaya Hadzich, René Rutten & Michael Buyens; and mastered by Alan Ward at Electric City.

Many speculate that it was the new experimental directions of the group, as well as the inability of the label to market them that signaled the end of their contract with Century Media.

This is the last studio album to feature original bassist Hugo Prinsen Geerligs until Beautiful Distortion which was released in 2022.

Track listing 

On the CD version, "Telson" appears as a hidden track in the pregap. On the vinyl edition of this album, Telson is the final bonus track. There is a four-minute pregap between "Jelena" and "A Life All Mine" that often elongates the length of "Jelena" when the disc is ripped (pregaps are usually appended to the previous track in this process).

There's also a promo CD version with only the first 8 tracks. Monsters and We Just Stopped Breathing are swapped, and the Monsters track is only 4:18 long.

Charts

Personnel 

The Gathering
 Anneke van Giersbergen – lead vocals/guitars
 René Rutten – guitars
 Frank Boeijen – keyboards
 Hugo Prinsen Geerligs – bass
 Hans Rutten – drums

Guests
 Kristoffer Rygg – lyrics and vocals on "A Life All Mine"
 Kristin Fjellseth – choirs on "You Learn About It"
 Wouter Planteijdt – electric and acoustic guitars on "These Good People" and "You Learn About It"
 Mathias Eick – trumpet on "We Just Stopped Breathing"
 Kid Sublime – beats on "We Just Stopped Breathing"
 Michael Buyens – bass guitar on "You Learn About It" and "Monsters"
 Zlaya Hadzich – lyrics on "Monsters" and "We Just Stopped Breathing"

Production
Artwork, Design – iNDEX Utrecht
Composed by, performer, Arranged By – The Gathering, Zlaya Hadzich
Engineer – David Klooker, Ignaz Bruens, Sietze Gardenier, Zlaya Hadzich
Lyrics by – Anneke van Giersbergen (tracks: 1 to 5, 8 to 10), Trickster G. (tracks: 10), Zlaya Hadzich (tracks: 6, 7)
Mastered by – Alan Ward
Mixed by – Michael Buyens, René Rutten, Zlaya Hadzich
Photography by – Esther Marbus
Photography by [Flowers] – Niels Coppes
Producer – Zlaya Hadzich

References 

The Gathering (band) albums
2003 albums